Larry Gene Taylor (August 7, 1953 – July 6, 2005) was an American politician and businessman who served as a member of both chambers of the Missouri General Assembly.

Early life and education 
Taylor was born in Carthage, Missouri, the son of Dorothy Taylor and the late Missouri congressman, Gene Taylor. He was a graduate of Sarcoxie High School, and went on to Missouri Southern State University.

Career 
Taylor was the youngest delegate at the 1972 Republican National Convention. He owned an automobile dealership, Gene Taylor Ford and Sales, and was an automobile and boat wholesaler. He was first elected to the Missouri House of Representatives in 2002 and elected to the Missouri Senate in 2004.

Personal life 
He was married to Gay Taylor, and had three children, Charles, Chelsea, and Jaime. He attended the First Baptist Church in Cassville, Missouri, and was an active member of the local Lions International Club. He was a resident of Shell Knob, Missouri. Taylor died in Joplin, Missouri in 2005.

References

1953 births
2005 deaths
People from Shell Knob, Missouri
Republican Party members of the Missouri House of Representatives
Republican Party Missouri state senators
Missouri Southern State University alumni
American automobile salespeople
20th-century American politicians
People from Carthage, Missouri